Folkestone railway station may refer to the following stations in Folkestone, England

Folkestone Central railway station - one of the two main railway stations in the town
Folkestone East railway station - the first railway station in the town, closed in 1965
Folkestone Harbour railway station - the closest railway station to the port, closed to regular traffic in 2001
Folkestone West railway station - the other main railway station
Eurotunnel Folkestone Terminal - the British terminal for the road vehicle shuttle services through the Channel Tunnel

See also
Template:Folkestone railway stations